The list of ship launches in 1699 includes a chronological list of some ships launched in 1699.


References

1699
Ship launches